Alexandros Chalatsis (born 16 June 2000) is a Greek professional footballer who plays as an attacking midfielder for Super League 2 club Apollon Larissa.

References

2000 births
Living people
Greek footballers
Super League Greece players
Gamma Ethniki players
Football League (Greece) players
Super League Greece 2 players
Athlitiki Enosi Larissa F.C. players
AEP Kozani F.C. players
Apollon Larissa F.C. players
Association football midfielders
Footballers from Larissa